Rhabdochona papuanensis is a species of nematode parasite. It parasitises freshwater fishes from Papua New Guinea, particularly Glossamia gjellerupi and Melanotaenia affinis.

Description
Rhabdochona papuanensis differs from its congeners in having hammer-shaped deirids.

This type of parasite is more host specific than other parasites. It is the first species, in its family, to be known of parasitizing Atheriniformes fish. 
In research from Moravec et al. (2008) Rhabdochona papuanensis is one of the first species of its kind to be recorded in the Australian zoogeographical region.

References

Ascaridida
Parasitic nematodes of fish